The NASCAR Sprint Showdown and Sprint All-Star Race XXV was the 25th anniversary running of NASCAR's special non-points race involving winners of the 2008 and 2009 NASCAR Sprint Cup Series races through the 2009 Southern 500 presented by GoDaddy.com as well as Sprint All-Star Race XV-XXIV winners, and past Sprint Cup champions from the decade covering 1999 to 2008.  The event was run Saturday night, May 16, 2009, at the  Lowe's Motor Speedway in the Charlotte, North Carolina suburb of Concord. Both the All-Star Race and the Showdown were broadcast on Speed in the United States while MRN broadcast it on the radio and Sirius XM Radio on satellite radio.

Eligible drivers and teams
The following drivers qualified for the race in these categories:

Past Cup champion drivers
The following six drivers fit into the past Champions category:
Jimmie Johnson (Seven-time series champion, and reigning champion)
Tony Stewart (Three-time series champion)
Kurt Busch (2004 series champion)
Matt Kenseth (2003 series champion)
Jeff Gordon (Four-time series champion, most recently 2001)
Bobby Labonte (2000 series champion)

Past All-Star Race winning drivers
The following five drivers were eligible as a past winner of the event in the last decade:
Kasey Kahne (2008 Sprint All-Star Race)
Kevin Harvick (Sprint All-Star Race XXIII winner)
Mark Martin (Sprint All-Star Race XXI winner)
Ryan Newman (Sprint All-Star Race XVIII winner)
Dale Earnhardt Jr. (Sprint All-Star Race XVI winner)

2008 and 2009 race winners
The following seven drivers were eligible by winning a Sprint Cup points race in 2008 or 2009:
Greg Biffle (2008 Sylvania 300)
Carl Edwards (2008 Auto Club 500)
Kyle Busch (2008 Kobalt Tools 500)
Denny Hamlin (2008 Goody's Cool Orange 500)
Clint Bowyer (2008 Crown Royal Presents the Dan Lowry 400)
Jeff Burton (2008 Food City 500)
Brad Keselowski (2009 Aaron's 499)

Qualified in the top two of the 2009 NASCAR Sprint Showdown
Sam Hornish Jr.
Jamie McMurray

Received the 2009 Fan Vote
Joey Logano

NOTE: Joey Logano was the youngest driver to race the NASCAR Sprint All-Star Race in the 25 years of the event.

Qualifying
The qualifying for the Showdown, which was scheduled for May 15 was cancelled for the first time in history, due to rain.  Usually, NASCAR rules state that the cars would start on the rulebook factor (top 35 owners, plus qualifying attempts and past champions), but as this was a non-points race, the cars starting position were based on the qualifying order draw.  And as a result, Kirk Shelmerdine was on the pole. However, he and outside pole winner Carl Long started from the back as neither had presented their cars on time, so David Stremme and Dave Blaney started the race up front.

For the All-Star Race, the format is different from the regular qualifying that occurs in the weekly events.  There are three laps, including a four-tire pit stop following either the first or second lap with penalties for loose lugnuts and violating the pit road speed limit on entry.  Jimmie Johnson had the fastest time, and started on the pole. Tony Stewart only took two tires but then backed up and changed the other two tires on his pit stop. He did not receive a penalty since he went back and changed the other two tires, but it did cause him to start 15th.

Format change
For 2009, the race remained 100 laps, but the four segments were altered.  The first "quarter" consisted of 50 laps, with a mandatory green flag pit stop at Lap 25.  This was followed by two 20-lap segments, then a ten-minute intermission and a final, 10-green flag lap shootout for the cash.

Also, only drivers qualified for the race, unlike previous years, where drivers and teams both qualified for the event by winning a race from the 2008 Daytona 500 until the 2009 Southern 500 presented by GoDaddy.com.

Sam Hornish Jr. and Jamie McMurray finished 1st and 2nd in the Sprint Showdown (a pair of 20-lap races—20 laps in the first, 20 green flag laps in the second).  Sprint customers and fan balloting onsite at NASCAR events voted in Joey Logano.

Skills challenges

Pit Crew Challenge presented by Craftsman
The "Skills Challenges" of the Sprint All-Star Race began with the May 14 Craftsman NASCAR All-Star Pit Crew Challenge at Time Warner Cable Arena in Charlotte.  A winning pit crew - the Jeff Burton #31 RCR team – and individual tire changers, carriers, and fuelers were crowned as champions of the skills challenge. For winning the event, the Burton team got the first pick on pit road.

Pennzoil Victory Challenge
The second annual Pennzoil Victory Challenge was held as part of the pre-race activities.

This year's event was changed from a timing skills to a freestyle event similar to NBA Slam-Dunk and NHL Trick Shot challenges.

The five judges were:
 Randy Moss, co-owner, Randy Moss Motorsports and New England Patriots wide receiver
 Ric Flair, retired professional wrestler who also served as the event's honorary race director
 Kevin Costner, actor who also held a pre-race concert with Modern West
 Jimmy Spencer, SPEED
 Montgomery Gentry, a/k/a Montgomery Gentry, the race's grand marshals.

Kevin Harvick won the event, beating Clint Bowyer, Jeff Gordon, Greg Biffle, Kasey Kahne, Kyle Busch and Darrell Waltrip 

Harvick challenged the Fox Sports analyst, who won Sprint All-Star Race I, to the event on an episode of Trackside Live! on Speed, and Waltrip, who had driven for Dale Earnhardt, Inc. with the #1 Chevrolet in 1998, accepted Harvick's challenge to participate in the Victory Challenge as part of Sprint All-Star Race XXV.

Carl Long's record penalty
In practice  for the Sprint Showdown, Carl Long blew a motor and requested to change his engine. Per NASCAR procedure and the one-engine per weekend rule, NASCAR confiscated the blown motor and allowed Long to change his engine. However, in inspecting the blown engine, the engine was found to be 358.17 cubic inches, 0.17 cubic inches too big. (NASCAR reportedly has a tolerance to 0.10 cubic cm.) Long was penalized 200 driver and owner points (despite the race being a non-points event), crew chief Charles Swing was fined $200,000, and the team was suspended for 12 races, a record penalty. Long appealed, claiming the excessive size was due to engine wear and the blowing-up of the engine. He also said the engine had 50 less horsepower that NASCAR's top teams despite being 0.17 cubic cm too big. After initially not being able to pay the fine, a number of donations, including some from NASCAR drivers has allowed the fine to be paid. Although Long lost his appeal, the appeals board did allow Long to compete in lower-level racing series, such as NASCAR Nationwide Series races. The penalty was later reduced from 12 to eight races, but the $200,000 fine was retained.

The $200,000 fine record was broken in 2013 when Michael Waltrip Racing was fined $300,000 for their involvement in Spingate. Long was eventually reinstated and cleared to compete in the Cup Series in May 2017.

References

NASCAR Sprint All-Star Race
Sprint All-Star Race
NASCAR races at Charlotte Motor Speedway
NASCAR All-Star Race
NASCAR controversies